Ziarul Financiar is a daily financial newspaper published in Bucharest, Romania. Aside from business information, it features sections focusing on careers and properties, as well as a special Sunday newspaper. Ziarul Financiar also publishes Transylvanian, Proprietati, Ziarul de duminica, Profesii, Dupa afaceri, supplements and a monthly magazine, go4it!, which is provided freely to the newspaper's subscribers.

General data  
In April 2003, Ziarul Financiar has launched a press package that together with ZF also contains its cultural supplement, the Sunday Newspaper (rom. Ziarul de Duminică), the Weekend After Business (rom. După Afaceri) supplement and the Discovery magazine (rom. Descoperă).

Since 2004, Ziarul Financiar has launched a series of Yearbooks - The Top of the Most Valuable Companies of Romania, The Top Players of the Economy, Top Transactions, Who's Who in Business and The Top 1,000 Business people in Romania.

Ziarul Financiar also publishes the publication "Business Directory of Romania", which was launched in 2006. Currently (October 2019), Ziarul Financiar is edited by Mediafax Group and is coordinated by Cristian Hostiuc, Editorial Director, and Sorin Pâslaru, Editor-in-Chief.

Awards and distinctions 
The Journalists of Ziarul Financiar  have won over the years the most prestigious national media awards, as well as a number of international distinctions:

 YOUNG JOURNALIST OF THE YEAR
 Economy-Business Section: Georgiana Stavarache (2004)
 Science and Technology Section: Adrian Seceleanu (2007)
 Advertising Section: Irina Florea (2005)

 SUPERBRANDS
 Ziarul Financiar was included among the most valuable Romanian brands at The Business Superbrands Gala in 2007 and 2008/2009

 GALA OF THE CAPITAL MARKET AWARDS
 The Excellence Award for the reflection of the capital market, the economic press category (2009)
 The Excellence Award for the quality of the capital market analysis awarded to a specialized publication (2008)
 Award of excellence for professionalism in the reflection of the capital market: Andrei Chirileasa (2008)
 The prize for the most interesting publication to reflect the capital market (2007)
 The Excellence Award for the quality of the capital market analysis granted to a daily newspaper (2006, 2005, 2004, 2003)

 MOBILE COMMUNICATIONS GALA 
 IT&C Journalist of the 2009: Adrian Seceleanu

 INSURANCE MARKET AWARDS
 Publication of the Year (2002, 2003, 2004, 2005)

 PRIZES FOR ECONOMIC JOURNALISM "FLORIN PETRIA" 
 Business Category - Adelina Mihai (2011)

 Inauguration Gala of the 2018 Stock Market Year
 Inauguration Gala of the stock exchange year organized by the Bucharest Stock Exchange (BVB) The prize for the best coverage of the capital market in 2018 by a media institution

 IAA Excellence Awards – 2014 Media Category: Award for Excellence in Print Media - Cristian Hoștiuc

 The Capital Market Awards Gala - September 27, 2013 Andrei Chirileasa, the editor of ZF's capital markets department, received the "Journalist of the Year" award from the brokers
 Award for the support of the stock market (awarded to a publication)
 The prize for combativeness and promptness in news reporting related to the capital market

 The Capital Market Awards Gala 2002 The prize for the best newspaper journalist of economic-financial profile: Laurențiu Ispir

 The Capital Market Awards Gala 2003 The Excellence Award for the capacity to analyse information from the capital market granted to a daily newspaper

 The Capital Market Awards Gala 2004 Award of excellence for the quality of capital market analysis granted to a daily newspaper 
 The most appreciated daily newspaper from the point of view of the promptness and accuracy of the analyses on the capital market

 The prize for the best financial analyst The author of the most appreciated economic and financial analyses - Vlad Nicolaescu

 The Capital Market Awards Gala 2005 The Excellence Award for the quality of capital market analysis - daily newspaper section

 The Capital Market Awards Gala 2006 The excellence award for the quality of the capital market analysis granted to a daily newspaper

 The Capital Market Awards Gala 2007 The Prize for the Most Interesting Publication that Reflecting the Capital Market

 The Capital Market Awards Gala 2008 The Excellence Award for the quality of the capital market analysis granted to a specialized publication
 The prize of excellence for professionalism in the reflection of the capital market: Andrei Chirileasa 
 The prize for the most consistent commentator on the stock market: Andrei Chirileasa

 The Capital Market Awards Gala 2009 Excellence Award for the reflection of the capital market - economic press category

 The Capital Market Awards Gala 2010 The prize for promptness in disseminating the information from the capital market – granted to a specialized publication

 The Capital Market Awards Gala 2011 The award for journalist of the year: Andrei Chirileasa
 The prize for combativeness and promptness in reporting the news related to the capital market (granted to a publication)
 The Award for the support of the stock market (awarded to a publication)

 The Capital Market Awards Gala 2014 Category "Actions to support the capital market": The prize for promoting the solidarity of the business community in Romania

 The Capital Market Awards Gala 2018' Anniversary award "Romania 100"'' - for the contribution to the promotion of the capital market.

Notable contributors
Silviu Brucan
Daniel Dăianu
Ovidiu Pecican
Alex Mihai Stoenescu

References

External links
 Official website
English version

Business newspapers
Newspapers published in Bucharest
Publications with year of establishment missing
Romanian-language newspapers